Býleistr (also Byleist) is the brother of Loki in Norse mythology.

Name 
The meaning of the Old Norse name  is uncertain.

Various forms are attested in the manuscripts of the Prose Edda: 'Býleistr' (Codices Regius and Wormianus), 'Blýleistr' (Codex Trajectinus), or 'Býleiptr' (Codex Upsaliensis).

Attestations 
Although there is no action involving Býleistr in the original sources, Loki is frequently called by the kenning 'Byleist's brother' (bróðir Býleists), such as in Völuspá (51), Hyndluljóð (40), or Skáldskaparmál (16).

In both Gylfaginning (34) and Skáldskaparmál, Snorri Sturluson explicitly states that Byleist is, along with Helblindi, one of Loki's two brothers.

Based on this relation, a number of scholars have considered Býleistr to be a son of Fárbauti and his consort Laufey. However, his exact role in the ancient mythic complex surrounding Loki's family remains unclear.

References

Bibliography 

 

Jötnar
Loki